Propebela spitzbergensis is a species of sea snail, a marine gastropod mollusk in the family Mangeliidae.

Description
The length of the shell varies between 7 mm and 20 mm.

(Original description) The characteristics of this species are close to Propebela rugulata; the relations between the spire and the aperture, are typical. This species differs, in its sculpture, in having a more projectant angle, which may occasionally pass into a sharp protuberant edge and in a somewhat more marked spiral striation. The operculum appears to be somewhat broader than the typical one. The teeth of the radula have a peculiar recess upon the one side; the form, otherwise, is the broad typical one. Out of 6 specimens examined, all showed the same uniform structure.

Distribution
This marine species occurs off Spitzbergen.

References

 Bogdanov, I. P. Mollusks of Oenopotinae subfamily (Gastropoda, Pectinibranchia, Turridae) in the seas of the USSR. Nauka, 1990.
 Gofas, S.; Le Renard, J.; Bouchet, P. (2001). Mollusca. in: Costello, M.J. et al. (eds), European Register of Marine Species: a check-list of the marine species in Europe and a bibliography of guides to their identification. Patrimoines Naturels. 50: 180-213

External links
 
 Nekhaev, Ivan O. "Marine shell-bearing Gastropoda of Murman (Barents Sea): an annotated check-list." Ruthenica 24.2 (2014): 75

spitzbergensis
Gastropods described in 1886